The North Tour is the fifth concert tour by American pop-rock band, Matchbox Twenty. The tour supports the band's fourth studio album, North. Beginning October 2012, the band has played over 60 shows in Australia, the Americas, Europe and Asia. The tour ranked 66th on Pollstar's annual "Top 100 Mid Year North American Tour". It earned $4.9 million from 40 shows.

Background
The tour was announced in August 2012, via the band's official website. While promoting the album at several festival shows (including the iTunes Festival), the tour was marked to begin in Australia; October 2012. Dates in North America and Europe were revealed in November 2012. For the tour, the band has teamed up with Tickets-for-Charity, a charity offering tickets that supported charitable causes. With each ticket purchased through their website, TFC will donate a portion of the proceeds to the Children's Health Fund. Additionally, the band has partnered with Mobile Roadie to create a free app to follow the band on tour. The app will feature the band's video history, along with, previews of their current album. Users will also be able to follow an interactive map of the tour route and purchase tickets. Each person who downloads the app has a chance to win backstage passes for the tour.

Opening acts
Evermore (Australia, excluding Wollongong)
INXS (Australia)
Matt Hires (North America, select dates)
Phillip Phillips (North America, select dates)

Setlist

Tour dates

Festivals and other miscellaneous performances
This concert was a part of "Universal Orlando Mardi Gras"
This concert is a part of the "Live Music Rocks Concert Series"
This concert is a part of "Rock in Rio"

Cancellations and rescheduled shows

Box office score data

Critical response
The shows in Australia received moderate praise from music critics. Noel Mengel (The Courier-Mail) stated the shows at the Brisbane Entertainment Centre, "restore his faith in modern rock 'n' roll", He says, "Matchbox pursue the middle path and they are very good at it. But after two hours of it, it seems the only one in the room who feels like smashing a guitar is me". For the two shows in Sydney, George Palathingal (The Canberra Times) gave the shows two and a half out of five stars. He explains, "[…] the songs follow such a similar pattern —big, promising opening guitar riffs lead to anthemic-but-generic soft-rock choruses, with Thomas's over-emoted vocals on top—that the set soon gets tiresome. Most in the room probably did 'have a good time tonight'. But that big finish was scant reward for those of us who just want better music throughout a headlining set". In Perth, the concert was deemed "an impressive evening" by Courtney Pearson (The West Australian). She says "They came back for an encore with synth-driven 'Put Your Hands Up' and 1997 hit 'Push', Thomas' voice so arresting you had to stand still and watch".

Notes 
1.Data from study is collected from all concerts held between January 1 and June 30, 2012 in North America. All monetary figures are based in U.S. dollars. All information is based upon extensive research conducted by Pollstar.

External links
Official website

References

2012 concert tours
2013 concert tours
Matchbox Twenty concert tours